The Coronado Island leaf-toed gecko (Phyllodactylus coronatus) is a species of gecko. It is endemic to the Coronado Islands in Mexico.

References

Phyllodactylus
Reptiles described in 1966